The Australian Architecture Association (AAA) was set up in 2004 as a not-for-profit organisation to promote the understanding of both local and world architecture in Australia. The Chicago Architecture Foundation (CAF) is used as the model for the development of the organisation.

History
In late 2004, the Australian Architecture Association began to offer talks by internationally renowned architects as the Black Talk Series.  In 2005, regular architecture tours showcasing important buildings and architecture of Sydney led by volunteer tour leaders began in Sydney city and architecturally significant suburbs of Surry Hills and Castlecrag.  In 2006, the Australian Architecture Association started the annual Sydney Architecture Festival on World Architecture Day, first Monday of every October, with the Australian Institute of Architects and the New South Wales Architects Registration Board.

Founding Committee
The founding committee has a mix of architects, marketing professionals and publicists. The founding President is Glenn Murcutt, winner of the 2002 Pritzker Prize and the founding committee are, Wendy Lewin, Harry Seidler, Richard Johnson, James Grose, Ian Moore, Alex Popov, David Bare and Manu Siitonen. Supporting them are the founding directors, Stella de Vulder and Annette Dearing.

External links
Official Web Site

Architecture organisations based in Australia
Non-profit organisations based in New South Wales